Kolyshkino is a rural locality (a selo) and the administrative center of Kolyshkinskoye Rural Settlement, Staropoltavsky District, Volgograd Oblast, Russia. The population was 545 as of 2010. There are 15 streets.

Geography 
Kolyshkino is located on the east bank of the Volgograd Reservoir, 50 km west of Staraya Poltavka (the district's administrative centre) by road. Ilovatka is the nearest rural locality.

References 

Rural localities in Staropoltavsky District